Bagulin, officially the Municipality of Bagulin, is a 5th class municipality in the province of La Union, Philippines. According to the 2020 census, it has a population of 14,428 people.

Etymology
Tradition reveals that Bagulin derived its name from a Kankanaey tribal leader. In the middle of the 18th century, the municipality is part of the township of Allabok which covers the moderate slopes of the mountain ranges overlooking the China Sea. During those times, tribal wars were prevalent. Allabok involved itself in a tribal war headed by Bagulin who led the community to victory. From then on until his death, people highly regarded him as their noble leader. After his death, consensus with the residents together with the concurrence of Spanish authorities resulted in naming the community after Bagulin. At present, Kankanaey still dominate the town's population.

Another etymological version dictates that "Bagulin" was derived from the term bago which means "lowland natives". This version is further supported by the fact that Kankanaeys comprise about 85% of the municipal population.

History
The community was moved to Picdel, a narrow valley strip along the Naguilian-Bagulin river. By 1903, the American regime established a paramilitary government and institutional facilities. Education was introduced and a bamboo community hall roofed with cogon was erected. As of 1903, the community was under the jurisdiction of the Mountain Province, sub-province of Benguet with capital at La Trinidad. By 1918, under the agreement of Governor Guzman of Mt. Province and Governor Pio Ancheta of La Union, Bagulin became a municipal district of Burgos under the province of La Union.

By 1928, the community centers were moved to a nearby settlement called Suyo where the present town center is situated. The former community center was named “Nangalisan” which means an abandoned place in the Ilokano language. Settlers who improved Suyo were Ilokano people who came from Naguilian. At that time, a bamboo chalet was constructed to serve as an administrative hall. The administration then was composed of the Mayor, a Secretary-Treasurer, and one policeman. Municipal income is very small that the administration had to prod reluctant taxpayers to pay their dues.

On June 25, 1963, Bagulin was transformed into a regular, full-pledged municipality by virtue of Executive Order No. 42.

Geography
Bagulin is situated at the interior eastern portion of La Union. It is generally mountainous and forested. It is bounded by the following municipalities:
 North — San Gabriel
 West — City of San Fernando
 Southwest — Naguilian
 South — Burgos
 East — Kapangan

The main entrance to lowland municipalities is through the Naguilian-Bagulin Road. It can be reached by vehicles and any regular means of transportation through the town of Naguilian.

Barangays
Bagulin is politically subdivided into 10 barangays. These barangays are headed by elected officials: Barangay Captain, Barangay Council, whose members are called Barangay Councilors. All are elected every three years.

 Alibangsay
 Baay
 Cambaly
 Cardiz
 Dagup
 Libbo
 Suyo (Poblacion)
 Tagudtud
 Tio-angan
 Wallayan

Climate

Demographics

Economy

Government
Bagulin, belonging to the second congressional district of the province of La Union, is governed by a mayor designated as its local chief executive and by a municipal council as its legislative body in accordance with the Local Government Code. The mayor, vice mayor, and the councilors are elected directly by the people through an election which is being held every three years.

Elected officials

National Cultural Treasure
The town is home to one National Cultural Treasure of the Philippines, which is the Burial Caves of Sitio Alabok in Barangay Cambali.

Gallery

References

External links

 Municipality of Bagulin
 [ Philippine Standard Geographic Code]
 Philippine Census Information
 Local Governance Performance Management System

Municipalities of La Union
Establishments by Philippine executive order